Bruno Duday (14 March 1880 – 31 January 1946) was a German film producer. After military service during the First World War Duday worked for many years at Germany's largest studio UFA where he oversaw several films of the Swedish star Zarah Leander including To New Shores (1937). Duday was head of a production unit, under the overall control of studio head Ernst Hugo Correll. When the Second World War began he resigned from UFA and volunteered for military service. He was in charge of a POW camp. Following his later capture by Allied forces at the end of the war, he suffered from ill health and died in Berlin in 1946. He was married several times including to the Hungarian actress Maria von Tasnady.

Selected filmography
 Love's Carnival (1930)
 The Stolen Face (1930)
 Farewell (1930)
 The Scoundrel (1931)
 The Wrong Husband (1931)
 Narcotics (1932)
 The Black Hussar (1932)
 The White Demon (1932)
 Laughing Heirs (1933)
 Inge and the Millions (1933)
 What Men Know (1933)
 The Girlfriend of a Big Man (1934)
 Just Once a Great Lady (1934)
 A Day Will Come (1934)
 Fresh Wind from Canada (1935)
 The Higher Command (1935)
 The Gypsy Baron (1935)
 The Court Concert (1936)
 To New Shores (1937)
 Men Without a Fatherland (1937)
 The Blue Fox (1938)
 A Prussian Love Story (1938)
 By a Silken Thread (1938)
 Adrienne Lecouvreur (1938)

References

Bibliography 
 Langford, Michelle. Germany: Directory of World Cinema. Intellect Books, 2012.

External links 
 

1880 births
1946 deaths
People from Sieradz
People from Kalisz Governorate
German film producers
German military personnel of World War I
German military personnel of World War II